Solís Grande Creek is a Uruguayan river, crossing Lavalleja, Canelones and Maldonado Departments. It flows into the Río de la Plata, between the seaside resorts of Jaureguiberry and Solís.

Contrary to what is popularly believed, it is not called Solís by the Spanish explorer Juan Díaz de Solís, but by a man named Solís whose lands were between two rivers, today known as Arroyo Solís Grande and Arroyo Solís Chico.

See also
List of rivers of Uruguay

References

Rivers of Uruguay
Rivers of Canelones Department
Rivers of Maldonado Department
Rivers of Lavalleja Department